Shropshire ( Salop) was a constituency of the House of Commons of the Parliament of England, then of the Parliament of Great Britain from 1707 to 1800, and of the Parliament of the United Kingdom from 1801 to 1832. It was represented by two Knights of the Shire. It was split into North Shropshire and South Shropshire in 1832.

Boundaries
The county limits.

History

Shropshire by the mid eighteenth century was seen as an independent county seat, controlled by the rank and file of the country gentry and tended to return Tory MPs despite the borough seats within Shropshire, and the dominant local Herbert and Clive families, being Whig.  From 1753 onwards there was a compromise by which the Tory country gentlemen chose the County MPs while the Herberts chose for Shrewsbury.

Members of Parliament

 Constituency created (1290)

MPs 1290–1653

MPs 1654–1660

MPS 1660–1832

Constituency abolished (1832)

Elections

See also
Parliamentary constituencies in Shropshire#Historical constituencies
List of former United Kingdom Parliament constituencies
Unreformed House of Commons

Notes

References

Parliamentary constituencies in Shropshire (historic)
Constituencies of the Parliament of the United Kingdom established in 1290
Constituencies of the Parliament of the United Kingdom disestablished in 1832